Thangadurai or Thangathurai is a Tamil male given name. Due to the Tamil tradition of using patronymic surnames it may also be a surname for males and females.

Notable people

Given name
 A. Thangathurai (1937–1997), Sri Lankan politician
 Thomas Thangathurai William, Sri Lankan politician

Surname
 Michael Thangadurai (born 1983), Indian actor
 Thangadurai Samuel, Indian musician

Alias
 Thangadurai (died 1983), Sri Lankan militant

See also
 
 

Tamil masculine given names